The 2017 Gibraltar Darts Trophy was the fifth of twelve PDC European Tour events on the 2017 PDC Pro Tour. The tournament took place at Victoria Stadium, Gibraltar from 12–14 May 2017. It featured a field of 48 players and £135,000 in prize money, with £25,000 going to the winner.

Michael van Gerwen was the defending champion after defeating Dave Chisnall 6–2 in the 2016 tournament, but he decided not to enter this tournament.

Michael Smith won his fourth PDC European Tour title by defeating Mensur Suljović 6–4 in the final.

Prize money
This is how the prize money is divided:

Qualification and format

The top 16 players from the PDC ProTour Order of Merit on 27 April automatically qualified for the event and were seeded in the second round.

The remaining 32 places went to players from five qualifying events - 18 from the UK Qualifier (held in Wigan on 28 April), eight from the West/South European Qualifier (held on 4 May), four from the Host Nation Qualifier (held on 11 May), one from the Nordic & Baltic Qualifier (held on 17 March) and one from the East European Qualifier (held on 29 April).

Following the withdrawal of Adrian Lewis the day before the event started for family reasons, the number of Host Nation Qualifiers was increased from four to five.

The following players took part in the tournament:

Top 16
  Peter Wright (semi-finals)
  Mensur Suljović (runner-up)
  Simon Whitlock (third round)
  Dave Chisnall (third round)
  James Wade (second round)
  Kim Huybrechts (second round)
  Benito van de Pas (third round)
  Gerwyn Price (second round)
  Alan Norris (third round)
  Jelle Klaasen (second round)
  Ian White (third round)
  Michael Smith (champion)
  Joe Cullen (second round)
  Daryl Gurney (semi-finals)
  Cristo Reyes (third round)
  Stephen Bunting (third round)

UK Qualifier 
  Paul Nicholson (first round)
  Darren Johnson (quarter-finals)
  Alan Tabern (second round)
  Steve Beaton (second round)
  James Wilson (quarter-finals)
  Adrian Lewis (withdrew)
  Chris Quantock (second round)
  James Richardson (second round)
  Darren Webster (second round)
  Justin Pipe (first round)
  Richie Corner (first round)
  Callan Rydz (first round)
  John Henderson (second round)
  Matt Clark (second round)
  Matthew Dennant (first round)
  Jonny Clayton (second round)
  Ritchie Edhouse (first round)
  Rob Cross (quarter-finals)

West/South European Qualifier
  René Eidams (first round)
  Jeffrey de Zwaan (first round)
  Christian Kist (second round)
  Martin Schindler (second round)
  Mike De Decker (first round)
  Mario Robbe (first round)
  Dimitri Van den Bergh (third round)
  Ronny Huybrechts (first round)

Host Nation Qualifier
  Dyson Parody (first round)
  Justin Broton (first round)
  Dylan Duo (first round)
  Manuel Vilerio (first round)
  Antony Lopez (first round)

Nordic & Baltic Qualifier
  Magnus Caris (quarter-finals)

East European Qualifier
  Krzysztof Ratajski (second round)

Draw

References

2017 PDC European Tour
2017 in Gibraltarian sport
Darts in Gibraltar